Arriving is a 2015 live album by the English jazz ensemble Loose Tubes recorded at Ronnie Scott's in September 1990 and at the BBC in 2014.

Reception
Selwyn Harris of Jazzwise stated, "Although they seem to mark the end of the reconciliation, the title Arriving suggests otherwise; Loose Tubes could, let’s hope, be around for a while yet. With eight further gems from the original Tubes repertoire, the band’s musical palette is as idiomatically broad as its musicians were diverse. It’s clear however from listening to Arriving that it never compromised the magical collective spirit and vision that the ensemble had when it took to the stage."

Track listing
"Armchair March"
"Children's Game"
"The Wolf's Dream and the Wild Eye"
"A"
"Nights at the Circus"
"Eden Express"
"Arriving"
"Fast Forward"
"As I Was Saying..."
"Bright Smoke, Cold Fire"
"Creeper"

References

 

2015 live albums
Loose Tubes albums
albums recorded at Ronnie Scott's Jazz Club